Proximus Mobility, LLC is a software-as-a-service (SaaS) company that has developed a proximity marketing service for retailers, malls and venues to deliver content to mobile devices via Bluetooth and Wi-Fi within 200–900 feet of the point of purchase.

Early history
Proximus Mobility was founded in Naples, Florida in 2009 by Michael Zeto and David Rippetoe. After presenting at the Florida Venture Forum in September 2010, Proximus Mobility received the Newcomer of the Year Award from the Naples Economic Development Council. Citing a lack of incentives for tech companies from the Florida government, Michael Zeto began searching for office space in Boston and Atlanta. At that point in time, Proximus Mobility was closing on a $2 million round of venture capitalist funding.

Move to Atlanta
Proximus Mobility moved to Atlanta in the summer of 2011, where the company's offices currently reside within Georgia Tech's Advanced Technology Development Center (ATDC) building on campus.

Georgia governor Nathan Deal touted Proximus Mobility's decision to move its headquarters to Atlanta as a "great credit to [the state of Georgia's] established infrastructure for high-tech companies that provides them with access to intellectual capital and some of the nation’s brightest talent for this industry." Governor Deal also stated that Proximus Mobility would bring at least 100 jobs to the state of Georgia.

Clients
Proximus Mobility worked with the ACE Group Classic while headquartered in Naples, Florida.

References

External links
Official Website
Effective Backlinks

Digital marketing companies of the United States